The canton of Le Lauzet-Ubaye is a former administrative division in southeastern France. It was disbanded following the French canton reorganisation which came into effect in March 2015. It consisted of 5 communes, which joined the canton of Barcelonnette in 2015. It had 1,335 inhabitants (2012).

The canton comprised the following communes:
La Bréole
Le Lauzet-Ubaye
Méolans-Revel
Pontis
Saint-Vincent-les-Forts

Demographics

See also
Cantons of the Alpes-de-Haute-Provence department

References

Former cantons of Alpes-de-Haute-Provence
2015 disestablishments in France
States and territories disestablished in 2015